The 2018 Anaheim mayoral election was held on November 6, 2018 to elect the mayor of Anaheim, California. It saw the election of Harry Sidhu. Sidhu is the first person of color to serve as mayor of Anaheim and the first Sikh to serve as the city's mayor.

Municipal elections in California are officially non-partisan.

Results

References 

Anaheim
Mayoral elections in Anaheim, California
Anaheim